El Ahmedi is a Mauritanean football club based in Nouakchott the capital of the Mauritania. 
The club plays in the Mauritanean Premier League.

Stadium
Currently the team plays at the 40000 capacity Stade Olympique (Nouakchott).

References

External links

Football clubs in Mauritania